The Feminine Monarchie, or the History of Bees is a 1609 science treatise by the English naturalist and apiarist Charles Butler. It is considered the first work on the science of beekeeping in the English language. The text brought into the public consciousness that a bee colony is presided over by a queen bee (noticed by Luis Mendez de Torres in 1586, and later conclusively proven by Jan Swammerdam). Butler also provided information on the keeping and forming of skeps, as well as his own personal enjoinders on the most effective beekeeping techniques. The book was the authoritative text on the topic for over two centuries, before the invention of the moveable comb made it somewhat obsolete. The book is organized into ten chapters. It also contains a madrigal of Butler's: "The Queen bee's song". The book sustained at least one further edition edited by Butler released in 1629. Another musical excursus of Butler's was an attempt to musically notate the "piping" noises of the queen bee.

References

1609 books
Treatises
Beekeeping in the United Kingdom